Basma Ouatay (born ) is a Moroccan individual rhythmic gymnast who trains in France. She represents her nation at international competitions.

She competed at world championships, including at the 2015 World Rhythmic Gymnastics Championships.

References

External links

Basma OUATAY

1999 births
Living people
Moroccan rhythmic gymnasts
Place of birth missing (living people)
Gymnasts at the 2014 Summer Youth Olympics